The discography of Natalie Lauren, formerly known as Suzy Rock, an American Christian hip hop and R&B artist, consists of a studio album; seventeen singles, including seven as a featured performer; three extended plays; a mixtape; four music videos; and twenty-one other guest appearances, including frequent collaborations with Lecrae, KB, Swoope, and Sho Baraka.

She started writing hip hop music, when she was 11, while she became a Christian at age 14. She began her hip-hop career in 2002. Sims relocated from Tampa to Atlanta, Georgia in 2007. In 2009, Sims, under the moniker Suzy Rock, released a mixtape entitled So What. In 2012, Sims released a music and teaching series called Dirty Little Secrets. In 2013, Sims dropped her stage name Suzy Rock, choosing instead to perform as Natalie Lauren. She released her second EP, Red Eyes & Blue Skies, in two parts during Cancer Awareness Week, a national event in the United States. On October 23, 2014, Sims released her third EP, entitled Cliff Notes, as a free download. In the fall of 2015, Sims appeared as a guest artist on the Queens United Tour, an all-female tour by V. Rose, HillaryJane, Jasmine Le'Shea and DJ KB. She released her first studio album, Handle with Care, in 2020 through Rostrum Records and Native North. Five singles were released for the album: "Meditate" in 2019, and "Something Something", "Just Breathe", "Back to Love", and "Bra Off" in 2020.

Studio albums

Extended plays

Mixtapes

Singles

As primary artist

As featured artist

Guest appearances

Music videos

References 

Discography
Discographies of American artists
Hip hop discographies
Rhythm and blues discographies
Christian music discographies